The 1997 Texas A&M–Commerce Lions football team represented Texas A&M University-Commerce in the 1997 NCAA Division II football season. They were led by head coach Eddie Vowell, who was in his 12th season at A&M-Commerce. The Lions played their home games at Memorial Stadium and were members of the Lone Star Conference (LSC). The Lions finished 11th in the LSC. It was the second losing season in a decade for the Lion football program.

Schedule

Postseason awards

All-Americans
Trent Dagen, Honorable Mention Tight End

All-Lone Star Conference

LSC Superlatives
Offensive Lineman of the Year: Trent Dagen

LSC First Team
Will Schale, Punter

LSC Second Team
Trent Dagen, Tight End
Carl Mitchell, Linebacker
Traco Rachel, Defensive Back

LSC Honorable Mention
Shon Adams, Defensive Back
Bret Bertrand, Defensive End
Kelvin Bradley, Linebacker
Casey Cowan, Receiver 
Donald Gross, Defensive Tackle
Antonio Wilson, Linebacker
Jessie Young, Defensive Tackle

References

Texas AandM-Commerce
Texas A&M–Commerce Lions football seasons
Texas AandM-Commerce Football